Phaea saperda is a species of beetle in the family Cerambycidae. It was described by Newman in 1840. It is known from Belize, Guatemala, Honduras and Mexico.

References

saperda
Beetles described in 1840